Benton County is one of the 36 counties in the U.S. state of Oregon. As of the 2020 census, the population was 95,184. Its county seat is Corvallis. The county was named after Thomas Hart Benton, a U.S. Senator who advocated American control over the Oregon Country. Benton County is designated as the Corvallis, OR Metropolitan Statistical Area, which is included in the Portland–Vancouver–Salem, OR–WA Combined Statistical Area. It is in the Willamette Valley.

History
Benton County was created on December 23, 1847, by an act of the Provisional Government of Oregon. The county was named after Democratic Senator Thomas Hart Benton of Missouri, an advocate of the doctrine of Manifest Destiny and the belief that the American government should control the whole of the Oregon Country. At the time of its formation the county included all the country west of the Willamette River, south of Polk County and running all the way to the California border in the south and the Pacific Ocean in the west.

The county was created out of lands originally inhabited by the Klickitat, who rented it from the Kalapuyas for use as hunting grounds. All aboriginal claims to land within Benton County were ceded in the Treaty of Dayton in 1855. Portions of Benton County were taken to form Coos, Curry, Douglas, Jackson, Josephine, Lane and Lincoln Counties, leaving Benton County in its present form.

The city of Marysville, later renamed Corvallis, was made the county seat in 1851. The city briefly was the capital of Oregon. In 1862 Corvallis became the site of the Oregon State Agricultural College, known today as Oregon State University.

Geography
It is the fourth-smallest county in Oregon by land area and third-smallest by total area.

Adjacent counties
 Polk County (north)
 Lincoln County (west)
 Linn County (east)
 Lane County (south)

National protected areas
 Siuslaw National Forest (part)
 William L. Finley National Wildlife Refuge

Demographics

2000 census
As of the census of 2000, there were 78,153 people, 30,145 households, and 18,237 families residing in the county. The population density was 116 people per square mile (45/km2). There were 31,980 housing units at an average density of 47 per square mile (18/km2). The racial makeup of the county was 89.16% White, 0.84% Black or African American, 0.79% Native American, 4.49% Asian, 0.24% Pacific Islander, 1.92% from other races, and 2.56% from two or more races. 4.66% of the population were Hispanic or Latino of any race. 18.2% were of German, 11.6% English, 8.9% Irish and 7.0% American ancestry. 91.1% spoke English, 4.1% Spanish and 1.0% Chinese as their first language.

There were 30,145 households, out of which 28.40% had children under the age of 18 living with them, 50.40% were married couples living together, 7.20% had a female householder with no husband present, and 39.50% were non-families. 26.10% of all households were made up of individuals, and 6.70% had someone living alone who was 65 years of age or older. The average household size was 2.43 and the average family size was 2.95.

In the county, the population was spread out, with 21.30% under the age of 18, 20.20% from 18 to 24, 26.70% from 25 to 44, 21.40% from 45 to 64, and 10.30% who were 65 years of age or older. The median age was 31 years. For every 100 females there were 99.10 males. For every 100 females age 18 and over, there were 97.80 males.

The median income for a household in the county was $41,897, and the median income for a family was $56,319. Males had a median income of $42,018 versus $29,795 for females. The per capita income for the county was $21,868. About 6.80% of families and 14.60% of the population were below the poverty line, including 10.60% of those under age 18 and 4.90% of those age 65 or over.

Benton County has the lowest church attendance per capita of any county in the nation (25% attendance).

2010 census
As of the 2010 census, there were 85,579 people, 34,317 households, and 19,256 families residing in the county. The racial makeup of the county was 87.1% white, 5.2% Asian, 0.9% black or African American, 0.7% American Indian, 0.2% Pacific islander, 2.3% from other races, and 3.6% from two or more races. Those of Hispanic or Latino origin made up 6.4% of the population. In terms of ancestry, 22.6% were German, 16.1% were English, 13.5% were Irish, and 3.6% were American.

Of the 34,317 households, 24.2% had children under the age of 18 living with them, 45.3% were married couples living together, 7.3% had a female householder with no husband present, 43.9% were non-families, and 28.2% of all households were made up of individuals. The average household size was 2.35 and the average family size was 2.87. The median age was 32.1 years.

The median income for a household in the county was $48,012 and the median income for a family was $71,763. Males had a median income of $50,282 versus $35,387 for females. The per capita income for the county was $26,177. About 7.7% of families and 19.1% of the population were below the poverty line, including 13.6% of those under age 18 and 5.5% of those age 65 or over.

2020 Census
The racial make up of the county is 75.9% non-Hispanic white, 1% African American, .6% Native American, 6.7% Asian, 6.1% of two or more races, and 9% Hispanic.

Communities

Cities
 Adair Village
 Albany (part)
 Corvallis (county seat)
 Monroe
 Philomath

Census-designated places
 Alpine
 Alsea
 Bellfountain
 Blodgett
 Kings Valley
 Summit

Unincorporated communities

 Alder
 Dawson
 Dry Creek
 Flynn
 Glenbrook
 Greenberry
 Harris
 Hoskins
 Lewisburg
 Noon
 Wren

Politics and government
For a long time Benton County strongly favored the Republican Party. In the 1932 Presidential Election, it was the only county in the state to vote for Herbert Hoover instead of FDR. Along with Riverside County in California it was one of only two counties in the Pacific States to be held by Hoover that year. As late as 1960 Benton was the most Republican county in the traditionally Republican state of Oregon, which at that point had never supported a Democrat other than FDR for president except for 1912 when the Republican Party was divided and a very narrow victory in 1868. Up to 1984 Benton County had voted for a Democratic presidential candidate only four times, in the above-mentioned 1868 election plus the national Democratic landslides of 1912, 1936 and 1964. In 1964, Lyndon Johnson became the first Democrat to win an absolute majority of the county's vote since Horatio Seymour.

The Republican edge in the county narrowed from the 1970s onward, culminating when it swung from a five-point victory for Ronald Reagan in 1984 to a nine-point victory for Michael Dukakis in 1988. Since then, Benton County has become a strongly Democratic county, and is usually the second-strongest Democratic bastion in the state, behind only Multnomah County (Portland). This is largely due to the leanings of Oregon State's student body and staff, closely tracking with Democratic gains in other counties influenced by college towns. No Republican has come within nine percentage points of carrying Benton County since 1988, and Barack Obama, Hillary Clinton, and Joe Biden have won the county by over thirty percentage points during each of the last four presidential elections.

Since 1972, Benton County has been a home rule county, meaning that the citizens have full control over the county charter, rather than using a standard charter issued by the state. The voters have chosen to eliminate the traditional elected county offices of Assessor, Treasurer, Surveyor, Justice of the Peace, and Clerk. Currently, they only elect three County Commissioners and a Sheriff.

The three current Benton County Commissioners are Chair Pat Malone, Xanthippe Augerot, and Nancy Wyse. They are all members of the Democratic Party and have served since 2019, 2017, and 2021; respectively. Wyse and Augerot's current terms expire in January 2025, while Malone's is up in January 2023.

The current Benton County Sheriff is Jef Van Arsdall. He was appointed to the office in March 2021 to fill the remainder of the term of retiring sheriff Scott Jackson.

Economy
Along with Oregon State University, agriculture, lumber, wood products, and some printing technology research and development form the economic base of the county. A substantial portion of the nation's research in forestry, agriculture, engineering, education and the sciences takes place at OSU.

See also
 National Register of Historic Places listings in Benton County, Oregon

References

Further reading
 David D. Fagan, History of Benton County, Oregon: Including... a Full Political History, ...Incidents of Pioneer Life, and Biographical Sketches of Early and Prominent Citizens... Portland, OR: A.G. Walling, Printer, 1885.
 H.O. Lang (ed.), History of the Willamette Valley: Being a Description of the Valley and its Resources, with an Account of its Discovery and Settlement by White Men, and its Subsequent History; Together with Personal Reminiscences of its Early Pioneers. Portland: Himes and Lang, 1885.
 Benton County, Oregon, Illustrated: Published under Direction of the Benton County Citizens' League. n.c.: Benton County Citizens' League, 1904. —Copies in collections at OSU and UO libraries.
 Portrait and Biographical Record of the Willamette Valley, Oregon, Containing Original Sketches of Many Well Known Citizens of the Past and Present. Chicago: Chapman Publishing Co., 1903.

External links
 Benton County Government website
 Food Insecurity in Rural Benton County

 
1847 establishments in Oregon Country
Populated places established in 1847